Eddie Edwards and Danie Visser were the defending champions, but Edwards did not participate this year.  Visser partnered Christo Steyn.

Steyn and Visser won the title, defeating Mark Edmondson and Wally Masur 6–7, 7–6, 12–10 in the final.

Seeds

  Mark Edmondson /  Wally Masur (final)
  Mike Leach /  Tim Wilkison (first round)
  Christo Steyn /  Danie Visser (champions)
  Jeremy Bates /  Michiel Schapers (semifinals)

Draw

Draw

References
 Draw

1986 Grand Prix (tennis)
1986 Bristol Open